Phaphamau is a constituency of the Uttar Pradesh Legislative Assembly covering the rural area of Phaphamau in Phulpur Lok Sabha constituency the Allahabad district of Uttar Pradesh, India.

Phaphamau is one of five assembly constituencies in the Phulpur Lok Sabha constituency. Since 2008, this assembly constituency is numbered 254 amongst 403 constituencies.
Before 2008 it was Nawabganj Assembly constituency. Delimitation Commission of 2002 abolished Nawabganj Assembly constituency.

Election results

2022

2017
Bharatiya Janta Party candidate Vikramjeet won in 2017 Uttar Pradesh Legislative Elections defeating Samajwadi Party candidate Ansar Ahmad by a margin of 25,985 votes.

References

External links
 

Assembly constituencies of Uttar Pradesh
Politics of Allahabad district